Sebastiania pteroclada is a species of flowering plant in the family Euphorbiaceae. It was originally described as Gymnanthes pteroclada Müll.Arg. in 1863. It is native to Rio de Janeiro, Brazil.

References

Plants described in 1863
Flora of Brazil
pteroclada